The PoP Shoppe is a soft drink retailer originating in 1969 at London, Ontario, by Gary Shaw in Canada. The PoP Shoppe avoided using traditional retail channels, selling its pop through franchised outlets and its own stores in refillable bottles in 24-cartons.

Original
Within three years, the company grew within the province to over 500 stores, and entered the United States in the following three years. Eventually, PoP Shoppe was selling throughout Canada and 12 American states. National Hockey League veteran Eddie Shack was the predominant spokesman for the brand. At its height, Pop Shoppe spawned a number of regional imitators, such as Saskatchewan's Pop House, Manitoba's Pick-A-Pop and Edmonton's Happy Pop.

The PoP Shoppe Pop enjoyed a regional popularity with residents of Portland, Oregon and surrounding environs as it was featured as the grand prize for winners of the "Smile Contest" and birthday celebrants on KPTV's "The Ramblin' Rod Show",

Circa 1977, there were 26 original flavours distributed from the Indianapolis bottling plant: cola, cream soda, fruit punch, grape, ginger ale, grapefruit, lemon, lemon-lime, lime rickey, orange, pineapple, root beer, strawberry, tonic water, soda water, black cherry, cherry cola, diet black cherry, diet cherry cola, diet cola, diet ginger ale, diet grapefruit, diet lemon, diet orange, diet root beer and diet strawberry.

In the early 1980s, sales slowed, largely blamed on competition from private label grocery store soft drink brands. The original company ceased operations in 1983 and its trademarks expired in 1993. A few small soft drink bottlers in the U.S. have at times sold pop using some of the millions of bottles and cases left abandoned by the closure; those were not related or authorized brands.

Re-establishment
Burlington businessman Brian Alger re-established The PoP Shoppe brand in 2004 after buying the rights to the brand in 2002. Today The Pop Shoppe is sold through distributors, wholesalers, big box clubs and distribution centres rather than company-owned outlets. The PoP Shoppe is available in retail, food service and club outlets throughout Canada. 

Many of the original flavours returned, with a new marketing approach based on nostalgia. The glass bottles are of a new design and are no longer refillable. They are, however, refundable in provinces that operate province-run recycle centres. The PoP Shoppe uses reclaimed glass in the making of new bottles. 

The new PoP Shoppe flavours are black cherry, cola, cream soda, grape, lime rickey, orange, pineapple and root beer.

In 2009, The Pop Shoppe brought back the classic stubby-style bottle that was popular in Canada during the 1970s. Although, with the stubby positioned on retail shelves next to their long-neck competitor bottles, the appearance of the stubby was consumers were getting less and sales plummeted. In 2011, the stubby was discontinued and brought in line with the rest of the industry's long-neck craft soda bottle.

In 2012, The PoP Shoppe announced that they were replacing corn syrup with cane sugar in all of their beverages.

In 2016, The PoP Shoppe was acquired by Beverage World Inc.

In 2019, The PoP Shoppe introduced two new flavours, Cotton Candy and Bubble Gum. 2019 also commemorates that the brand has lasted longer in its 2nd go-around than its original stint of 14 years! 

In 2022, The PoP Shoppe introduced another new flavour, Rocket Blast, reminiscent of the iconic retro rocket popsicle.

References 

 Paul-Mark Rendon, Marketing Magazine: "Popping down memory lane", Toronto: Rogers Media Inc., 27 September 2004
 brandchannel: "The Pop Shoppe - pops back" (12 December 2005)

External links
 The Pop Shoppe official website
 1978 Pop Shoppe Commercial

Food and drink companies established in 1969
Food and drink companies established in 2002
Drink companies of Canada
Re-established companies
Soft drinks
Food and drink companies disestablished in 1983
1969 establishments in Ontario
Companies based in London, Ontario